Syedna Ismail Badruddin (II) Bin Syedi Sheikh Adam (died on 7 Moharram 1150 H/1738 AD in Jamnagar, India) was the 38th Dā'ī of the Dawoodi Bohras. He succeeded the 37th Da'i Syedna Noor Mohammad Nooruddin to the religious post.

Syedna Badruddin became Da'i al-Mutlaq in 1130 AH/1719 AD. His period of Da'wat was from 1130-1150 AH/ 1719-1738 AD for about 19 years and 6 months.

Family
He was born in Udaipur in 1686 during the tenure of Syedna Abduttayyeb Zakiuddin II. His father Syedi Sheikh Adam Safiyuddin, brother of Syedna Musa Kalimuddin was a scholar and writer. Syedna Badruddin lost both his parents when he young. He married Syedna Musa Kalimuddin's daughter Jivana BaiSaheba who bore him one daughter. By his second marriage with Fatema AaiSaheba, he had two sons, Syedi AbdeMusa Kalimuddin and Syedna Abduttayyeb Zakiuddin III.

References

Further reading
The Ismaili, their history and doctrine by Farhad Daftary (Chapter -Mustalian Ismailism- p. 300-310)
The Uyun al-akhbar is the most complete text written by an Ismaili/Tayyibi/Dawoodi 19th Dai Sayyedna Idris bin Hasan on the history of the Ismaili community from its origins up to the 12th century CE period of the Fatimid caliphs al-Mustansir (d. 487/1094), the time of Musta‘lian rulers including al-Musta‘li (d. 495/1101) and al-Amir (d. 524/1130), and then the Tayyibi Ismaili community in Yemen.

Dawoodi Bohra da'is
1738 deaths
Year of birth unknown
18th-century Ismailis